Adam Serwer (born 1982) is an American journalist and author. He is a staff writer at The Atlantic where his work focuses on politics, race, and justice. He previously worked at Buzzfeed News, The American Prospect, and Mother Jones.

Serwer has received awards from the National Association of Black Journalists (NABJ), The Root, and the Society of Professional Journalists. He was named a spring 2019 Shorenstein Center fellow, and received the 2019 Hillman Prize for Opinion & Analysis Journalism.

Life and career 
Serwer was raised in Washington, D.C. His father, Daniel Serwer, was in the Foreign Service, which resulted in Serwer spending part of his childhood overseas. His mother, Jacquelyn Serwer, is the chief curator of the Smithsonian Institution's National Museum of African American History and Culture. His father is Jewish and his mother is African-American. He has a brother named Jared Serwer.

Serwer received his bachelor's degree from Vassar College and his master's degree from the Columbia University Graduate School of Journalism. Following graduate school, he was a writing fellow at The American Prospect. He later worked at Mother Jones, MSNBC, The Washington Post, Jack and Jill Politics, Salon, and The Atlantic as a guest blogger for Ta-Nehisi Coates. He began work at BuzzFeed News as the national editor in August 2014. Serwer was hired as a senior editor at The Atlantic on August 15, 2016. His work there has focused on white supremacy, race in America, and the Trump administration. Essays such as "The Nationalist's Delusion", "White Nationalism's Deep American Roots", and "The Cruelty Is the Point" have been cited by other journalists in various outlets. He has also appeared on other media outlets such as All Things Considered, The Opposition with Jordan Klepper, In the Thick, and On My Mind with Diane Rehm to discuss his writing. In his best known essay, "The Cruelty Is the Point", published in 2018, Serwer argued that the Trump administration’s policies were not only cruel, but cruel by design.

Serwer received a fellowship from the Shorenstein Center in 2019, for which he researched the historical role of African Americans and voting. He received the 2019 Hillman Prize for his work on the rise of Trump, Trumpism and America's history of racism.

His first book, The Cruelty Is the Point: The Past, Present, and Future of Trump's America, is a collection of essays that was released June 29, 2021 by One World/Penguin Random House. The book was named to the New York Times Best Seller list. Kirkus reviewed it as "a strong contribution to conversations about racism, injustice, and violence, all of which continue to plague this country." Conservative writer Helen Andrews criticized the book in The American Conservative as "the most toxic piece of journalism of the Trump era."

Personal life 
Serwer is married. He and his wife have one daughter (b. 2019). He practices Judaism.

He has multiple cats whom he frequently tweets about and refers to as "the Garfields" because they are all orange. A dog named Korra was added to the household in the spring of 2021.

Works

Books 
  2019.

Essays 

Serwer, Adam (June 9, 2022). "The One Group Who Could Make a Difference on Gun Control." The Atlantic. Retrieved September 4, 2022
Serwer, Adam (July 23, 2022). "Is Democracy Constitutional?" The Atlantic. Retrieved September 4, 2022.

Accolades 
 2012 – Salute to Excellence Awards, Magazines - Commentary/Essay, "All the President's Frenemies," NABJ
2012 – The Root 100, The Root
2013 – The Root 100, The Root
2015 – Sigma Delta Chi Award Honoree, Online Column Writing, "Race in America," Society of Professional Journalists
 2018 – The Root 100, Media, The Root
2019 – Spring Fellow, Shorenstein Center
2019 – Lipman Fellow, Columbia Journalism School
2019 – Hillman Prize for Opinion & Analysis Journalism, Hillman Foundation
 2019 – Forward 50, The Forward (2019)
2020 – Vernon Jarrett Medal, Morgan State University

References

External links 

Columns at The Atlantic

1982 births
African-American Jews
African-American journalists
African-American writers
American political journalists
Columbia University Graduate School of Journalism alumni
Jewish American writers
Journalists from Washington, D.C.
Living people
Vassar College alumni
Jewish American journalists
21st-century African-American people
21st-century American Jews
20th-century African-American people